The 1979 UC Davis Aggies football team represented the University of California, Davis as a member of the Far Western Conference (FWC) during the 1979 NCAA Division II football season. Led by tenth-year head coach Jim Sochor, UC Davis finished the season with an overall record of 6–3–1 and a mark of 5–0 in conference play, winning the FWC title for the ninth consecutive season. 1979 was the tenth consecutive winning season for the Aggies. With the 5–0 conference record, they stretched their conference winning streak to 33 games dating back to the 1973 season. The team outscored its opponents 217 to 155 for the season. The Aggies played home games at Toomey Field in Davis, California.

After the season, Cal Poly Pomona, who beat UC Davis in a non-conference game, had to forfeit all their victories because the team had used ineligible players during the season. With the forfeit, the Aggies' overall record improve to 7–2–1.

Schedule

NFL Draft
The following UC Davis Aggies players were selected in the 1980 NFL Draft.

References

UC Davis
UC Davis Aggies football seasons
Northern California Athletic Conference football champion seasons
UC Davis Aggies football